Cyrillia aequalis is a species of sea snail, a marine gastropod mollusk in the family Raphitomidae.

Description
The length of the shell varies between 5 mm and 10 mm.

Distribution
This marine species occurs from Norway to the Western Mediterranean

References

 Gofas, S.; Le Renard, J.; Bouchet, P. (2001). Mollusca, in: Costello, M.J. et al. (Ed.) (2001). European register of marine species: a check-list of the marine species in Europe and a bibliography of guides to their identification. Collection Patrimoines Naturels, 50: pp. 180–213

External links
 Jeffreys J.G. (1862-1869). British conchology. Vol. 1: pp. cxiv + 341 [1862. Vol. 2: pp. 479 [1864]. Vol. 3: pp. 394 [1865]. Vol. 4: pp. 487 [1867]. Vol. 5: pp. 259 [1869]. London, van Voorst]
 Jeffreys J.G. (1862-1869). British conchology. Vol. 1: pp. cxiv + 341 [1862. Vol. 2: pp. 479 [1864]. Vol. 3: pp. 394 [1865]. Vol. 4: pp. 487 [1867]. Vol. 5: pp. 259 [1869]. London, van Voorst] ]
 Fassio, G.; Russini, V.; Pusateri, F.; Giannuzzi-Savelli, R.; Høisæter, T.; Puillandre, N.; Modica, M. V.; Oliverio, M. (2019). An assessment of Raphitoma and allied genera (Neogastropoda: Raphitomidae). Journal of Molluscan Studies
 Gastropods.com: Raphitoma aequalis
 Natural History Museum, Rotterdam: Raphitoma aequalis
 

aequalis
Gastropods described in 1867